San Carlo al Corso is a neo-classic church in the center of Milan.

The church is managed by the Servite Order.

The church facade was designed in 1844 by Carlo Amati and was finished in 1847. It then served as a model for the Chiesa Rotonda in San Bernardino, Switzerland, 1867.

The complex was built to replace Convent of the Servite founded as early as 1290 and later was suppressed in 1799. The new church was built in thanks for the ending a cholera epidemic, and dedicated to Saint Charles Borromeo who was the Bishop of Milan during the time of the bubonic plague in Milan during the 16th century.

See also

 List of buildings in Milan 
 San Carlo al Corso (Rome)

References

External links

Carlo
Neoclassical architecture in Milan
Roman Catholic churches completed in 1847
Tourist attractions in Milan
19th-century Roman Catholic church buildings in Italy
Neoclassical church buildings in Italy